The following is the organization of the Union forces engaged at the Battle of Wyse Fork, during the American Civil War in 1865. The Confederate order of battle is listed separately.

Abbreviations used

Military Rank
 MG = Major General
 BG = Brigadier General
 Col = Colonel
 Ltc = Lieutenant Colonel
 Maj = Major
 Cpt = Captain
 Lt = Lieutenant

Other
 w = wounded
 mw = mortally wounded
 k = killed
 c = captured

Department of North Carolina

Major General John M. Schofield

District of Beaufort/Cox's Provisional Corps
Major General Jacob D. Cox
 Aide-de-Camp BG George S. Greene
 Aide-de-Camp Bvt BG Israel N. Stiles

Notes

American Civil War orders of battle